John Winchester may refer to:

 John de Winchester (died 1460), bishop of Moray
 John Winchester (Supernatural), television character